Music from the Original Television Series Drop Dead Diva was released by Madison Gate Records in 2010. It consists of music featured in the first season of the Lifetime television series Drop Dead Diva.

Overview
The track list includes 14 songs performed by various artists that include: Brooke Elliott, Margaret Cho, Ben Feldman, Scott Starrett, Confetti, Alana D, Becca Jones, Platinum Pied Pipers, Lil' Wendy, Madi Diaz, Dri, Katie Herzig, Malbec and Joshua Morrison.

Full track listing
This is the full track list for the soundtrack.
 "Would I Lie to You" – Brooke Elliott and Margaret Cho
 "I'll Get Mine" – Becca Jones
 "On a Cloud" – Platinum Pied Pipers
 "Shake It" – Lil' Wendy
 "Restraining Order" – Margaret Cho
 "Nothing at All" – Madi Diaz
 "Don't Wait" – Dri
 "Beautiful Inside" – Katie Herzig
 "Free" – Malbec
 "Home" – Joshua Morrison
 "Wish You Well" – Katie Herzig
 "Begin Again" (pop version) – Confetti
 "Baby, I Need Your Loving" – Ben Feldman
 "Suite from Drop Dead Diva" – Scott Starrett

References

2010 soundtrack albums
Television soundtracks
Madison Gate Records soundtracks